The Anvil Lake Campground Shelter is located in Eagle River, Wisconsin. It was built by the Civilian Conservation Corps of the New Deal and was added to the National Register of Historic Places in 1996.

References

Buildings and structures in Vilas County, Wisconsin
Park buildings and structures on the National Register of Historic Places in Wisconsin
Civilian Conservation Corps in Wisconsin
Rustic architecture in Wisconsin
Buildings and structures completed in 1936
National Register of Historic Places in Vilas County, Wisconsin
Log buildings and structures on the National Register of Historic Places in Wisconsin